The American Music Award for Favorite Country Single is a major music industry award that was created in 1974. However, the award was discontinued after 1995.

Years reflect the year in which the American Music Awards were presented, for works released in the previous year.

The all-time winner of awards in this category was Kenny Rogers. Rogers won a total of 5 AMA Favorite Country Single trophies, two of which were shared as part of a duet with Dolly Parton.

Winners and nominees

American Music Award for Favorite Pop/Rock Video

American Music Award for Favorite Pop/Rock Male Video Artist

American Music Award for Favorite Pop/Rock Female Video Artist

American Music Award for Favorite Pop/Rock Band/Duo/Group Video Artist

American Music Awward for Favorite Pop/Rock New Artist

American Music Award for Favorite Country Video
 Two-time nominees: Alabama, Hank Williams Jr., Reba McEntire and Willie Nelson

American Music Award for Favorite Country Male Video Artist
 Two-time nominees: Hank Williams Jr.

American Music Award for Favorite Country Female Video Artist
 Three-time nominees: Anne Murray
 Two-time nominees: Janie Fricke

American Music Award for Favorite Country Band/Duo/Group Video Artist
 Two-time nominees: Alabama and The Oak Ridge Boys

American Music Award for Favorite Soul/R&B Video

American Music Award for Favorite Soul/R&B Male Video Artist

American Music Award for Favorite Soul/R&B Female Video Artist

American Music Award for Favorite Soul/R&B Band/Duo/Group Video Artist

American Music Awward for Favorite Soul/R&B New Artist

American Music Award for Favorite Heavy Metal/Hard Rock Artist

American Music Award for Favorite Heavy Metal/Hard Rock Album

American Music Award for Favorite Heavy Metal/Hard Rock New Artist

American Music Award for Favorite Rap/Hip-Hop New Artist

American Music Award for Favorite Dance Artist

American Music Award for Favorite Dance Song

American Music Award for Favorite Dance New Artist

References

American Music Awards
Country music awards
Song awards
Awards established in 1974
1974 establishments in the United States
Awards disestablished in 1995